Salma K. Farid Academy (SKF Academy) is a private Islamic preschool and elementary school in Hamden, Connecticut.

The  non-profit coeducational school's core principles, curriculum, and daily practices are based solely on the Quran and Sunnah of Prophet Muhammad. The school serves children between the ages of 3 and 12 years old during the day, and up to 18 years after school. It also offers adult classes in the evenings.

Programs 
The mission of SKF Academy is to provide excellent all-around care and education in a pleasant and stimulating Islamic environment and to inculcate Islamic manners in its students. The curriculum includes Qur'an, Arabic, Islamic Studies, language arts, mathematics, sciences and social studies. The school hopes to have the  first Islamic library and reading center in North America.

History 

The school opened in October 2008 under the sponsorship of Tariq Farid and his family. It is named in honor of Farid's mother, Salma K. Farid, who died in 2005.

References

External links 

 Salma K. Farid Academy Official Website

Buildings and structures in Hamden, Connecticut
Schools in New Haven County, Connecticut
Islamic schools in Connecticut
2008 establishments in Connecticut
Educational institutions established in 2008